Alexander Downs (28 May 1876 — 17 July 1924) was a Scottish first-class cricketer.

Downs was born Uddingston in May 1876. A club cricketer who played as a wicket-keeper for Uddingston, he made a single appearance in first-class cricket for Scotland against the touring South Africans at Edinburgh in 1907. Playing as a wicket-keeper in the Scottish team, Downs was dismissed without scoring by Bert Vogler, while following-on in their second innings he was dismissed for a single run by Reggie Schwarz. Outside of cricket, he was a partner in the family joinery and building contracting business. Downs went missing on Friday, 11 July 1924, with his body being discovered in the River Clyde nearly a week later on Thursday, 17 July near the Haughhead Bridge at Uddingston.

References

External links
 

1876 births
1924 deaths
People from Uddingston
Scottish cricketers
Scottish businesspeople
Deaths by drowning in the United Kingdom